Mumbai Indians (MI) are a franchise cricket team based in Mumbai, India, which plays in the Indian Premier League (IPL). They were one of the eight teams that took part in the 2014 Indian Premier League. They were captained by Rohit Sharma for the second season in succession.

Mumbai Indians reached the Eliminator of playoff stage in the 2014 IPL where they were defeated by the Chennai Super Kings. Mumbai qualified for the 2014 Champions League Twenty20, but did not advance from the group stage.

Squad
 Players with international caps before the start of 2014 IPL are listed in bold.

Indian Premier League

Season standings

Match log

Champions League Twenty20

Qualifier standings

Match log

References

Mumbai Indians seasons
2014 Indian Premier League